This article lists the commanders-in-chief of the Armed Forces of Haiti, from the end of the U.S. occupation in 1934 through the disbandment of the FAd'H in 1995, during the Operation Uphold Democracy, until the reinstatement of the FAd'H in 2017.

Officeholders

Commanders of the Guard of Haiti

Chiefs of the General Staff of the Army

Commanders-in-chief of the Armed Forces of Haiti 

|-style="text-align:center;"
|colspan=8|Armed Forces disbanded(20 February 1995 – 17 November 2017)
|-

Timeline

See also 

 Military history of Haiti

Notes

References

Bibliography 
 Daniel Supplice, Bibliographic dictionary of political personalities of the Republic of Haiti 1804–2001. Lanno Imprimerie, Belgium 2001, 

Commanders in chief
Commanders in chief
Commanders in chief
Haiti, Commanders in chief
Haiti
Haiti
Commanders in chief